Halenia deflexa, also known as green gentian or spurred gentian is a native flower of the northern regions of the United States (Montana, North Dakota, Wisconsin, Michigan, Maine, and Pennsylvania) as well as all of Canada. It is mostly found in wetlands or moist forests of these regions. The blooming season is typically from July to August.

Each has a spur up to a fifth inch long, extending back past the sepals (each of the parts of the calyx of a flower, enclosing the petals). The color of H. deflexa is a shade of purple or a light green. The sepals are green and elliptic (adjoined between the spurs) about half the length of the petals above the spur.

The fruit of the plant is a capsule, conical in shape, which sticks out from the opening of the flower. The fruit is typically dry and once ripe will split open.

The leaves are characteristically toothless, hairless, and glossy. The stems of the green gentian are hairless and square.

References

Flora of the United States
Flora of Canada
deflexa